The 1971 New England Patriots season was the franchise's 2nd season in the National Football League and 12th overall.  The 1971 season was the first that the team played as the New England Patriots, changing their name from the Boston Patriots, briefly to the Bay State Patriots before changing it again to the New England Patriots, in an effort to regionalize the franchise's equal distance from Boston and Providence.

The Patriots finished with six wins and eight losses, third place in the AFC East Division. It was the first season the Patriots played in the new Schaefer Stadium in Foxborough, Massachusetts, after playing in three different stadiums the previous three seasons in Boston.

During training camp, the Dallas Cowboys traded disgruntled running back Duane Thomas to the Patriots for Carl Garrett and Halvor Hagen on July 31. Thomas became embroiled in a conflict with head coach John Mazur, prompting Patriots general manager Upton Bell to request that Commissioner Pete Rozelle void the trade three days after it had been made. Rozelle granted Bell's request, and the traded players returned to where they had been prior to the deal.

Offseason

NFL Draft

Staff

Roster

Regular season

Schedule

Standings

References

External links
Pro Football Reference – 1971 New England Patriots

New England Patriots
New England Patriots seasons
New England Patriots
Sports competitions in Foxborough, Massachusetts